Alive on Arrival is the first album by the American singer-songwriter Steve Forbert, released in 1978.

Track listing
All songs written by Steve Forbert

"Goin' Down to Laurel" – 4:39
"Steve Forbert's Midsummer Night's Toast" – 2:49
"Thinkin'" – 3:25
"What Kinda Guy?" – 2:34
"It Isn't Gonna Be That Way" – 4:55
"Big City Cat" – 3:50
"Grand Central Station, March 18, 1977" – 4:13
"Tonight I Feel So Far Away from Home" – 3:14
"Settle Down" – 3:46
"You Cannot Win If You Do Not Play" – 4:33

Personnel
Steve Forbert – guitar, harmonica, vocals
David Sanborn – alto saxophone on "Big City Cat"
Brian Torff – acoustic bass on "Tonight I Feel So Far from Home"
Steve Burgh – lead guitar
Dennis Good – trombone
Robbie Kondor – organ, piano
Barry Lazarowitz – drums, tambourine
Hugh McDonald – bass; electric guitar on "What Kinda Guy?"
Harvey Shapiro – pedal steel
Technical
Glenn Berger, Charles Clifton - engineer
Danny Fields - front cover photography

References

1978 debut albums
Steve Forbert albums
Columbia Records albums